Roger Chew Weightman (June 15, 1787 – February 2, 1876) was an American politician, civic leader, and printer. He was the eighth mayor of Washington, D.C. from 1824 to 1827.

Early and family life
Weightman was born in Alexandria, Virginia, in 1787, moving into the new capital in 1800 and taking an apprenticeship with a local printer. His father Richard Weightman was an emigrant from Whitehaven, England. Chew was his mother's maiden name.

Printer and soldier
Weightman bought the printing business in 1807, making him a congressional printer. He maintained a number of shops on Pennsylvania Avenue, about ten blocks from the White House, from about 1813 onward. He was a successful businessman, running a book store and owning several buildings, including ones used by the city for offices until City Hall was built.

Wieghtman served in the Army during the War of 1812 and fought at the Battle of Bladensburg. In August 1814, Weightman (by now a First Lieutenant in D.C.'s Light Horse Cavalry) was apprehended by the British troops descending on the White House during the Siege of Washington, a battle in the War of 1812, and made to march with them to the Executive Mansion. Rear Admiral George Cockburn made Weightmann  accompany the invaders into the mansion where the admiral teased him with mischievous relish. When Cockburn told him to select a memento of the visit, Weightman chose an item of value, only to be told by the admiral that everything of value would be destroyed and the he must instead select a worthless souvenir. Weightman choose a souvenir (albeit one of no monetary value) to remember the day the American capital was defeated.

Mayor of Washington D.C.
After serving seven one-year terms as an alderman on Washington's city council, the council elected Weightman in 1824 to serve out the remainder of the late mayor Samuel N. Smallwood's term. In 1826 he ran against former mayor Thomas Carbery; four years prior, Weightman had run against Carbery for mayor and lost by a narrow margin, but had then pressed the matter in court in a legal battle that lasted until the end of Carbery's term. In 1824, Weightman won more decisively by the use of blustery promises and insults against his opponent. One handbill from the era reads, 
NOTICE EXTRAORDINARY.
R.C. Weightman, a man of known liberal principles; all those who vote for this gentleman at tomorrow's election, will have general permission to sleep on the Benches in the Market House, this intense warm weather. May the curse of Dr. Slop light on all those who vote for Tom Carberry.

While mayor, Weightman headed the 1825 committee for the inauguration of John Quincy Adams, then the following year chaired the national memorial committee for the president's deceased father and his successor Thomas Jefferson.

In 1827, Weightman became cashier of the Washington Bank, and resigned his position as mayor. He would run again, unsuccessfully, against Walter Lenox in 1850.

Thomas Jefferson's last letter
The last letter that Thomas Jefferson, the third president of the United States and the writer of the Declaration of Independence, ever wrote was sent to Roger C. Weightman. It was a letter declining an invitation to join a celebration for the 50th anniversary of the signing of the Declaration of Independence. The letter says:

Later years
Weightman was always heavily involved in the civic activity of the District.

During the 1820s, Weightman was a member of the prestigious society, Columbian Institute for the Promotion of Arts and Sciences, who counted among their members former presidents Andrew Jackson and John Quincy Adams and many prominent men of the day, including well-known representatives of the military, government service, medical and other professions.

In the years following his mayoralty, Weightman would be curator of the Columbia Institute; a founding member and officer of the Washington National Monument Society; Grand Master of the Freemasons of the District of Columbia; chief clerk, and later librarian, of the United States Patent Office; and the center of Washington's social activity. He managed the Washington Turnpike and led the citizen's committee for building the C&O Canal.

From 1827 to 1837 he served as a Justice of the Peace. He continued to serve in the Militia of the District of Columbia, rising to the level of Major General. During the Civil War he helped organize Union Troops, pitting him on the opposite side in the war as his oldest son.

In addition to his busy social and professional life, Weightman was a noted and generous philanthropist — generous enough that his sizable fortune had dwindled to very little by the 1870s, when Weightman was living on his pension as a soldier and employee of the Patent Office. However, upon his death on February 2, 1876, his funeral was one of the best attended and most remembered of the era.

Family
In 1814, he married Louissa Serena Hanson and together they had ten children, including Richard Hanson Weightman who would serve as New Mexico territory's delegate to Congress from 1851–53, and then die in the Civil War as a Colonel in the Confederate Army. Louissa died around 1839.

Honors
A school built at 23rd and M, NW in 1887 was named the Weightman School in his honor. It later became the Roger C. Weightman School for Crippled Children and still later Roger C. Weightman Elementary School. It was razed sometime after 1938.

References

1787 births
1876 deaths
Mayors of Washington, D.C.
19th-century American politicians
Politicians from Alexandria, Virginia